Barker is a full-service advertising and digital agency based in New York City. The firm specializes in integrated, traditional and interactive marketing. Primary disciplines include Branding, Digital and Traditional Media Planning & Buying, Digital Content Creation, Interactive Development, and Social Media Marketing.

History
Founded in 2003 as DZP Marketing Communications, the firm was named to Entrepreneur Magazine’s 2005 “HOT 100” list of new small businesses in America. Client acquisitions in the early years included Atkins Nutritionals, Inc., eDiets.com  and Hastens luxury beds of Sweden. In 2008, the company was renamed BARKER, after founder John Barker (advertising executive).  Located in Manhattan's SoHo district for 10 years, the firm moved to the penthouse floor of 30 Broad Street in Lower Manhattan. More recent client acquisitions include Procter and Gamble’s People’s Choice Awards and peopleschoice.com, AETN’s History Channel, IDB Bank of NY, Conjure Cognac, Phoenix Capital, NYU Stern School of Business, CMT and BEST.

References

External links
 Official website
Official Instagram
 SMM Panel website

Advertising agencies of the United States
Companies based in New York City